Coby Sey is a British musician, songwriter, artist, vocalist and NTS Radio host, based in Lewisham, London. He has worked with musicians Tirzah, Mica Levi, DELS, Kwes, Klein, Lafawndah and London Contemporary Orchestra, artists Hannah Perry and Maëva Berthelot and has remixed Kelly Lee Owens, Max de Wardener and Leifur James. In 2019 he had a featured session on BBC Radio 3 Late Junction in an improvised collaboration with PAN affiliated artist Pan Daijing. Sey released his debut album, Conduit on 9 September 2022 on AD 93 to critical acclaim.

Artist discography

Albums

EPs

Soundtracks

Singles
"Shields / I Have To" (2016)
"Petals Have Fallen" (2017)
"Devotion" (Tirzah feat. Coby Sey) (2018)
"To" (2020)
"Melt! (Coby Sey Rework)" (Kelly Lee Owens) (2020)
"Tighter" (Cosha feat. Coby Sey) (2021)
"Kiss From a Rose" (Seal Cover) (2021)
"Permeated Secrets" (2022)
"Onus" (2 August 2022)

Notes

References

External links
Coby Sey on Bandcamp
Coby Sey on Discogs

British songwriters
English songwriters
Living people
Singers from London
People from Lewisham
British people of Ghanaian descent
English people of Ghanaian descent
21st-century English singers
Year of birth missing (living people)